Samavati was one of the queens of King Udena of Kosambi.  Her servant Khujjuttara became a foremost female lay disciple when she sent her to hear the Buddha's teachings and tell her about the teachings.  Samavati became so gladdened by Khujjuttara's discourse, she invited Buddha and his monks regularly to the palace to preach the Dharma to her and her 500 ladies in waiting. She became the foremost disciple in loving kindness and compassion.

External links
 https://web.archive.org/web/20060718000855/http://www.quangduc.com/English/buddha/10relativebuddha4.html

Foremost disciples of Gautama Buddha
Buddhism and women